Wymah  is a rural community in the south-east part of the Riverina very close to the border of Victoria, Australia. Wymah is situated on the Wymah River Road accessible from Bowna.

The place name is derived from the Aboriginal word meaning "White Cockatoo". Wagra Post Office opened on 1 February 1879, was renamed Wymah in 1912 and closed in 1952.

The Wymah Ferry crosses the Murray River when the Hume Dam is full; in low water conditions, the ferry cannot operate.

Notes and references

Towns in the Riverina
Towns in New South Wales
Populated places on the Murray River